Methyl 2-bromoacetate (methyl bromoactate) is a chemical compound with the molecular formula C3H5BrO2.

Properties
Methyl 2-bromoacetate is colorless or straw-colored liquid. The smell is sharp and penetrating. It is soluble in water and also has a higher density than water.  It is incompatible with acids, bases, oxidizing agents, and reducing agents.

Application
Methyl bromoacetate is an alkylating agent. It has been used to alkylate phenol and amino groups.  Moreover, it can be used to make vitamins and pharmaceutical drugs. It is commonly used as a reagent in chemical modification of histidine.  In addition, methyl bromoacetate also use in synthesize of coumarins and cis-cyclopropane. It reacts with conjugated base and produce alkylated carbene complexes.

Safety
Methyl bromoacetate can be toxic by ingestion and inhalation. It can also irritate the skin and eyes.

See also
Ethyl bromoacetate

References

Extra reading

Organobromides
Methyl esters
Alkylating agents
Lachrymatory agents